Grabów  is a village in Łęczyca County, Łódź Voivodeship, in central Poland. It is the seat of the gmina (administrative district) called Gmina Grabów.

The village has a population of 1,300.

References

Villages in Łęczyca County
Kalisz Governorate
Łódź Voivodeship (1919–1939)